Eden Township is one of the 25 townships of Licking County, Ohio, United States. As of the 2010 census the population was 1,248.

Geography
Located on the northern edge of the county, it borders the following townships:
Clay Township, Knox County - north
Jackson Township, Knox County - northeast
Fallsbury Township - east
Perry Township - southeast corner
Mary Ann Township - south
Newton Township - southwest
Washington Township - west

No municipalities are located in Eden Township.

Name and history
Statewide, other Eden Townships are located in Seneca and Wyandot counties.

Government
The township is governed by a three-member board of trustees, who are elected in November of odd-numbered years to a four-year term beginning on the following January 1. Two are elected in the year after the presidential election and one is elected in the year before it. There is also an elected township fiscal officer, who serves a four-year term beginning on April 1 of the year after the election, which is held in November of the year before the presidential election. Vacancies in the fiscal officership or on the board of trustees are filled by the remaining trustees.

References

External links

County website

Townships in Licking County, Ohio
Townships in Ohio